David Zogg (18 December 1902 – 26 July 1977) was a Swiss alpine and Nordic combined skier. He was raised in Arosa, Switzerland.

At the 1928 Winter Olympics in St. Moritz he finished 16th in the Nordic combined event.

In 1931, he won the first World Championship in Slalom and in 1934, he was World Champion in downhill skiing. In the 1930s, he participated in a few films about skiing.

 After retiring from ski racing, he was the head of the ski school in Arosa for many years.

David Zogg additionally played a role in opening up the exploration of the Himalayas by being appointed the deputy leader of the 1939 Swiss expedition to the Himalayas, undertaken by the Swiss Foundation for Alpine Research. The outcomes of this were "Exploration of the Ramani glacier basic, first ascent of Dunagiri (7066 m), Rataban (6156 m), Ghori Parbat (6714 m). Attempt on Chaukhamba (7138 m)" There's more about his mountaineering in the German article.

Filmography 
 Storm over Mont Blanc (1930)
 The White Ecstasy (1931)
 Die weiße Majestät (1933) from Anton Kutter, August Kern
 Mountain Man (1934) uncredited
 Die weißen Teufel (1935) from Alfred Abel, August Kern

References

External links

1902 births
1977 deaths
Swiss male alpine skiers
Swiss explorers
Swiss male Nordic combined skiers
Olympic Nordic combined skiers of Switzerland
Nordic combined skiers at the 1928 Winter Olympics
Swiss male ski mountaineers